Perrierodendron quartzitorum is a plant in the family Sarcolaenaceae. It is endemic to Madagascar.

Description
Its chartaceous to subcoriaceous leaves are obovate to elliptical in shape. The inflorescences bear one to three flowers, each with five sepals and five white petals.

Distribution and habitat
Perrierodendron quartzitorum is found only in a single location in the Itremo Massif in the central region of Amoron'i Mania. Its habitat is rocky areas and woodlands at about  altitude.

Threats
Perrierodendron quartzitorum is threatened by nomadic animal grazing and seasonal uncontrolled wildfires. The species population is decreasing. Formerly, there were subpopulations in Isalo and Zombitse-Vohibasia National Parks, but, as of the IUCN species assessment in 2015, there are no longer any subpopulations in protected areas.

References

Sarcolaenaceae
Endemic flora of Madagascar
Plants described in 2000